

Grand Prince of Tuscany

House of Medici

See also

Grand Dukes of Tuscany

Grand Princes of Tuscany
House of Medici
Grand Dukes of Tuscany